Chirodiscidae is a family of mites belonging to the order Sarcoptiformes.

Genera:
 Adentocarpus Fain, 1972
 Afrolabidocarpus Fain, 1970
 Alabidocarpus Ewing, 1929
 Asiolabidocarpus Fain, 1972
 Chirodiscus Trouessart & Neumann, 1890
 Dentocarpus Dusbábek & La Cruz, 1966
 Eulabidocarpus Lawrence
 Eurolabidocarpus Fain & Aellen, 1994
 Glossophagocarpus La Cruz, 1973
 Labidocarpoides Fain, 1970
 Labidocarpus Trouessart, 1895
 Lawrenceocarpus Dusbábek & La Cruz, 1966
 Lutrilichus Fain, 1970
 Olabidocarpus Lawrence, 1948
 Parakosa <small>McDaniel & Lawrence, 1962</</small>
 Paralabidocarpus Pinichpongse, 1963
 Paralawrenceocarpus Guerrero, 1992
 Pseudoalabidocarpus McDaniel, 1972
 Pteropiella Fain, 1970
 Rynconyssus Fain, 1967
 Schizocoptes Lawrence, 1944
 Soricilichus Fain, 1970
 Trilabidocarpus Fain, 1970

References

Sarcoptiformes